The I Central American Games (Spanish: I Juegos Deportivos Centroamericanos) was a multi-sport event that took place between 24 November - 2 December 1973.

The games were officially opened by Guatemalan Education Minister Alejandro Maldonado Aguirre.  Long distance runner Mateo Flores was honoured to light the torch in the stadium bearing his name.  The flame was ignited before in Q'umarkaj, one of the ancient cultural Mayan centers located in El Quiché, Guatemala.

María del Milagro París from Costa Rica won 13 gold and 1 silver medals in the swimming contests, and was chosen as the best athlete of the games by the journalists.

Participation
Athletes from 6 countries were reported to participate:

 Panamá

Sports
The competition featured 16 sports.

Aquatic sports
 Swimming
 Athletics
 Basketball
 Boxing
 Cycling
 Equestrian
 Fencing
 Football
 Judo
 Shooting
 Softball
 Table tennis
 Tennis
 Volleyball
 Weightlifting
 Wrestling

Medal table
The table below is taken from El Diario de Hoy, San Salvador, El Salvador, from El Nuevo Diario, Managua, Nicaragua,  and from the archives of La Nación, San José, Costa Rica.

External links
An almost complete list of medal winners can be found on the MásGoles webpage
(click on "JUEGOS CENTROAMERICANOS" in the low right corner).

References 

Central American Games
Central American Games
International sports competitions hosted by Guatemala
Central American Games
Cent
Multi-sport events in Guatemala